Rains County is a county located in the U.S. state of Texas. As of the 2020 census, its population was 12,164. Its seat is Emory. The county (and county seat) are named for Emory Rains, a Texas state legislator.

In 1970, Recorded Texas Historic Landmark Number 10860 was placed in the county courthouse lawn.

Geography
It is the fourth-smallest county in Texas by land area and fifth-smallest by total area.

Major highways
  U.S. Highway 69
  State Highway 19
  State Highway 276

Minor highways
  Farm to Market Road 47
  Farm to Market Road 275
  Farm to Market Road 513
  Farm to Market Road 514
  Farm to Market Road 515
  Farm to Market Road 779
  Farm to Market Road 2081
  Farm to Market Road 2324
  Farm to Market Road 2737
  Farm to Market Road 2795
  Farm to Market Road 2946
  Farm to Market Road 3274
  Farm to Market Road 3299

Adjacent counties
 Hopkins County (north)
 Wood County (east)
 Van Zandt County (southwest)
 Hunt County (northwest)

Communities

Cities

 East Tawakoni
 Emory (county seat)
 Point

Towns
 Alba (mostly in Wood County)

Unincorporated community
 Dougherty

Demographics

Note: the US Census treats Hispanic/Latino as an ethnic category. This table excludes Latinos from the racial categories and assigns them to a separate category. Hispanics/Latinos can be of any race.

As of the 2018 estimation, there were 12,159 people, 4,333 households, and 2,680 families residing in the county. By 2020, there were 12,164 people residing in the county. The population density was 53 people per square mile (21/km2). There were 5,411 housing units at an average density of 23 per square mile (9/km2). Per the 2000 census, the racial makeup of the county was 93.6% White, 2.6% Black, 1.1% Native American, 1.1% Asian, 0.06% Pacific Islander, and 1.6% from two or more races; 9.2% of the population were Hispanic or Latino of any race.

There were 4,333 households, out of which 28.80% had children under the age of 18 living with them, 61.90% were married couples living together, 9.10% had a female householder with no husband present, and 25.90% were non-families. 22.30% of all households were made up of individuals, and 11.20% had someone living alone who was 65 years of age or older.  The average household size was 2.60 and the average family size was 2.92.

In the county, the population was spread out, with 23.80% under the age of 18, 7.40% from 18 to 24, 25.10% from 25 to 44, 27.70% from 45 to 64, and 16.10% who were 65 years of age or older.  The median age was 41 years. For every 100 females there were 99.80 males.  For every 100 females age 18 and over, there were 96.40 males.

The median income for a household in the county was $48,308 and the median income for a family was $40,329. Males had a median income of $31,983 versus $21,594 for females. The per capita income for the county was $23,936.  About 11.40% of families and 17% of the population were below the poverty line, including 17.50% of those under age 18 and 14.10% of those age 65 or over.

Media
Rains County is part of the Dallas/Fort Worth DMA. Local media outlets are: KDFW-TV, KXAS-TV, WFAA-TV, KTVT-TV, KERA-TV, KTXA-TV, KDFI-TV, KDAF-TV, and KFWD-TV. Other nearby stations that provide coverage for Rains County come from the Tyler/Longview/Jacksonville market and they include: KLTV, KYTX-TV, KFXK-TV, KCEB-TV, and KETK-TV.

Education
The majority of the county is served by the Rains Independent School District located in Emory.

The far southeastern portion of the county is served by the Alba-Golden Independent School District.  The far northwestern corner of the county is served by the Lone Oak Independent School District.  A portion of north central Rains County is served by the Miller Grove Independent School District.

Politics

See also

 National Register of Historic Places listings in Rains County, Texas
 Recorded Texas Historic Landmarks in Rains County

References

External links

 Rains County government's website
 

 
1870 establishments in Texas
Populated places established in 1870
Recorded Texas Historic Landmarks